Fitrat may refer to:
Fitrat (TV series), Pakistani romantic drama television series

People
Abdul Qadir Fitrat, Afghan banker
Abdurauf Fitrat (1886-1938), Uzbek author, journalist and politician
Bihari Lal Fitrat (born 1829), historian of India
 Sadiq Fitrat (born 1935, known as Nashenas), Afghan musician